Freedom and Justice for All is a compilation album by American musician Charlie Daniels. Released on July 8, 2003, the compilation consists of Daniels' patriotic songs.

Track listing

Chart performance
Freedom and Justice For All peaked at number 55 on the U.S. Billboard Top Country Albums chart.

References

2003 compilation albums
Charlie Daniels albums